List of Balkan Athletics Championships winners may refer to:

List of Balkan Athletics Championships winners (men)
List of Balkan Athletics Championships winners (women)